Peter Spencer Bowness, Baron Bowness,  (born 19 May 1943) is a British politician, solicitor, and life peer. Since 1996, he has been a member of the House of Lords.

Early life
Bowness was born on 19 May 1943. He was educated at Whitgift School, an all-boys private school in South Croydon, London. He graduated from the University of Law, and began work as a solicitor in 1966.

Legal career
Bowness is a qualified solicitor and notary public. From 1970 to 2002, he was a partner at Weightman Sadler Solicitors in Purley, London Borough of Croydon. From 2002 to 2011, he was a consultant to Streeter Marshall Solicitors (the successor to the now merged Weightman Sadler Solicitors). Since then, he has not practised as a solicitor or notary public.

Political career

Councillor
Bowness became a councillor and soon rose within Conservative Party ranks, becoming Leader of Croydon Council, London's largest borough. During the 1980s, Bowness was said to have been one of Margaret Thatcher's favourite Council leaders, and took part in the abolition of the GLC. He was unusual amongst his Conservative colleagues, however, for supporting Ken Livingstone's low-cost public transport initiative, Fares Fair.

He continued as Leader until 1994 when the Labour Party won the local elections. He stepped down from the Council in 1998. He served as a member of the Committee of the Regions and the Audit Commission.

House of Lords
On 17 January 1996, Bowness was created a life peer as Baron Bowness, of Warlingham in the County of Surrey and of Croydon in the London Borough of Croydon. From December 2002 to November 2006, he was member of the Parliamentary Joint Committee on Human Rights. From December 2003 to May 2014, he served on the European Union Committee. He chaired the Foreign Policy Defence and Developmental Aid Sub-Committee of the EU Select Committee from 2003 to 2006, and chaired the Justice, Institutions and Consumer Protection Sub-Committee from 2009 to 2013.

Personal life
He is a patron of the Warehouse Theatre and was formerly a Governor of the Whitgift Foundation.

Honours
On 14 June 1981, Bowness was appointed a Deputy Lieutenant (DL) to the Lord Lieutenant of Greater London. In the 1981 Queen's Birthday Honours, he was appointed a Commander of the Order of the British Empire (CBE) in recognition of his service as Chairman of the London Boroughs Association.

In the 1987 New Year Honours, it was announced that he was to be made a Knight Bachelor "for political and public service". On 11 February 1987, he was knighted by Queen Elizabeth II during a ceremony at Buckingham Palace.

In 1987, Bowness was made Freeman of the City of London. In 2002, he was made an Honorary Freeman of the London Borough of Croydon.

On 1 May 1988, Bowness was appointed Honorary Colonel of the 151 (Greater London) Transport Regiment, Royal Corps of Transport (Volunteers), Territorial Army. On 5 April 1993, he stood down from the appointment and was granted permission to retain his honorary rank.

Arms

References

1943 births
Living people
Conservative Party (UK) life peers
Councillors in the London Borough of Croydon
Commanders of the Order of the British Empire
Knights Bachelor
People educated at Whitgift School
Deputy Lieutenants of Greater London
Life peers created by Elizabeth II